The  St. Louis Gateway Film Critics Association Award for Best Picture is one of the annual awards given by the St. Louis Gateway Film Critics Association.

Winners

2000s

2010s

2020s

Picture
Awards for best film